Lyngdal Church is a parish church of the Church of Norway in Lyngdal Municipality in Agder county, Norway. It is located in the town of Lyngdal. It is one of the churches for the Lyngdal parish which is part of the Lister og Mandal prosti (deanery) in the Diocese of Agder og Telemark. The white, wooden church was built in a cruciform design in 1848 using plans drawn up by the local parish priest Gabriel Kirsebom Kielland who modified standardized church plans by the famous church architect Hans Linstow. The church seats about 800 people, making it one of the largest churches in Southern Norway.

History
The earliest existing historical records of the church date back to the year 1429, but it was likely built during the 12th century. The old church on this site was a stone building with a rectangular nave and a narrower, rectangular chancel.

In 1814, this church served as an election church. Together with more than 300 other parish churches across Norway, it was a polling station for elections to the 1814 Norwegian Constituent Assembly which wrote the Constitution of Norway. This was Norway's first national elections. Each church parish was a constituency that elected people called "electors" who later met together in each county to elect the representatives for the assembly that was to meet in Eidsvoll later that year.

In 1847, the centuries-old church was torn down and during the next year, a new wooden cruciform church was built just a few meters north of the old church site. Some of the stone from the walls was reused in the foundation of the new church. The new church was much larger than the previous church. Originally, it was designed to hold 1636 people. Today, due to fire regulations and the large organ located on the 2nd floor gallery where there once was seating, there is only room for around 800 people.

Media gallery

See also
List of churches in Agder og Telemark

References

Lyngdal
Churches in Agder
Wooden churches in Norway
Cruciform churches in Norway
19th-century Church of Norway church buildings
Churches completed in 1848
12th-century establishments in Norway
Norwegian election church